Johann "Hans" Klima (11 February 1900 – 31 December 1945) was an Austrian international footballer. At club level, he played for Admira Wien, Olympique Antibes and FC Antibes. He made 11 appearances for the Austria national team, scoring three goals.

External links
 
 

Association football forwards
Austrian footballers
Austria international footballers
FC Admira Wacker Mödling players
FC Antibes players
Olympique Antibes players
1900 births
1945 deaths